Walter von Hollander (1892–1973) was a German screenwriter. He worked on several films directed by Georg Wilhelm Pabst.

Selected filmography
 The Empress's Favourite  (1936)
 Anna Favetti (1938)
 The Desert Song (1939)
 The Girl at the Reception (1940)
 The Comedians (1941)
The Master of the Estate (1943)
 Mysterious Shadows (1949)
 The Stronger Woman (1953)

References

Bibliography 
 Kreimeier, Klaus. The Ufa Story: A History of Germany's Greatest Film Company, 1918-1945. University of California Press, 1999.

External links 
 

1892 births
1973 deaths
German male screenwriters
Film people from Saxony-Anhalt
German male writers
People from Blankenburg (Harz)
20th-century German screenwriters